"Love Love Love" is a 1955 single by Webb Pierce, written by Ted Jarrett.  "Love Love Love" spent eight weeks at number one on the country charts and spent a total of thirty-two weeks on the charts.

References

 

1955 singles
Webb Pierce songs
1955 songs
Songs written by Ted Jarrett